2nd World Soundtrack Awards
October 19, 2002

Best Original Soundtrack:
 The Lord of the Rings:The Fellowship of the Ring
The 2nd World Soundtrack Awards were awarded on 19 October 2002 in Ghent, Belgium.

Winners
Soundtrack Composer of the Year:
Patrick Doyle - Gosford Park
Best Original Soundtrack of the Year:
The Lord of the Rings: The Fellowship of the Ring - Howard Shore
Best Original Song Written for a Film:
""If I Didn't Have You" - Monsters, Inc.
Composed by: Randy Newman
Performed by: Billy Crystal and John Goodman
Public Choice Award:
The Lord of the Rings: The Fellowship of the Ring - Howard Shore 
Discovery of the Year:
Klaus Badelt - The Time Machine
Lifetime Achievement Award:
Sir George Martin

References 

0
2002 film awards
2002 music awards